Paul McDonald (born 1961 in Walsall) is a British academic, comic novelist, and poet. He teaches English and American Literature at the University of Wolverhampton, where he also runs the Creative and Professional Writing Programme. 

He left school at 16 and began work as a saddlemaker, an occupation that provides the backdrop for his first novel, Surviving Sting (2001). After a period studying with the Open University, McDonald entered full-time education at Birmingham Polytechnic, where he began writing fiction, initially producing stories for the women's romance market under a female pseudonym. He later won a scholarship to research a PhD, and in 1994 took an academic post teaching American literature at the University of Wolverhampton.

His second novel, Kiss Me Softly, Amy Turtle (2004) is a comic mystery satirising the Midlands town of Walsall, while his third, Do I Love You? (2008), takes Northern Soul as its theme. His poetry began appearing in the early 1990s and embraces a range of themes and styles. Again humour is a feature, as is surrealism, but he also writes serious love poetry, and verse about art and travel. His most recent collections are Catch a Falling Tortoise (2007) and An Artist Goes Bananas (2012). McDonald's poetry has won several prizes, including the 2012 John Clare Prize. His academic writing includes books on Philip Roth, Joseph Heller, the fiction of The Black Country, and humour.

As a humour specialist, McDonald has made several TV appearances, including on BBC Breakfast and The One Show, and he is credited with identifying the oldest joke in the world. He discusses the latter, and some of the ideas contained in his book The Philosophy of Humour with Michael Grade in the BBC documentary Michael Grade & The World's Oldest Joke.

Bibliography

Poetry
The Right Suggestion (1999)
Catch a Falling Tortoise (2007)
An Artist Goes Bananas (2012)
Rimbaud's Hair (2017)

Novels
Surviving Sting (2001)
Kiss Me Softly, Amy Turtle (2004)
Do I Love You? (2008)

Criticism

Fiction from the Furnace (2002)
Students Guide to Philip Roth (2003)
Laughing at the Darkness (2011)
Reading Catch-22 (2012)
Reading Toni Morrison's Beloved (2013)
Storytelling (2014)
Philip Roth Through the Lens of Kepesh (2016)
The Enigmas of Confinement (2018)
Lydia Davis: A Study (2019)
Allen Ginsberg:Cosmopolitan Comic (2020)

Philosophy
The Philosophy of Humour (2013)

As editor
Loffing Matters (2006)
The Tipping Point (2012)

References

External links 
 Publisher's Website (fiction) 
 Publisher's Website (poetry) 
 University of Wolverhampton Staff Page 
 An Independent on Sunday article in which Paul McDonald discusses humour 
 A Birmingham Post article in which Paul McDonald gives advice on how to write humour. 

English male poets
English literary critics
21st-century English novelists
Alumni of Birmingham City University
Academics of the University of Wolverhampton
Living people
1961 births
English male novelists
21st-century English male writers
English male non-fiction writers